The Canadian Journal of School Psychology (CJSP) is a quarterly peer-reviewed academic journal that focuses on the theory, research, and practice of psychology in education. Its editor is Steven R. Shaw, McGill University, Canada. It was established in 1985 and is currently published by SAGE Publications.

Mission
Incorporating the concepts of student wellness. It includes the academic, cognitive, social, and emotional well-being of children and youth within educational settings.

Abstracting and indexing 
Canadian Journal of School Psychology is abstracted and indexed in:
 Contents Pages in Education
 Educational Research Abstracts Online
 PsycINFO
 SafetyLit
 Scopus

References

External links 
 

SAGE Publishing academic journals
English-language journals
Educational psychology journals
Quarterly journals
Publications established in 1985
1985 establishments in Canada